LuxConnect is a private company created under the initiative of the Luxembourg government in 2006. 
Its primary objectives are :
 the improvement of the national dark fiber network; 
 the building and operation of state of the art data centers.

LuxConnect's headquarter is located in Bettembourg, 4 rue A. Graham Bell, which is about 20 km South from Luxembourg City.

Mission 

The mission of LuxConnect is to strengthen the country's IT infrastructure and to support international Internet connectivity of Luxembourg through connections with foreign Internet exchange points.

History 

The company's key dates are:
 10 October 2006: Incorporation of LuxConnect S.A. by the State of Luxembourg as main shareholder.
 25 May 2009: Commissioning of the first data center (DC1.1) on the Bettembourg ICT campus
 March 2011: Commissioning of the second data center (DC1.2) on the Bettembourg ICT campus
 14 May 2012: Commissioning of the first data center (DC2) on the Bissen ICT campus
 21 March 2016: Completion of the implementation of 1000 km optical cables within the country of Luxembourg 
 13 June 2016: Commissioning of the third data center (DC1.3) on the Bettembourg ICT campus

Product Portfolio 

Dark fiber

LuxConnect owns and operates an optical fiber network consisting of 1.000 km of optical fiber cables across Luxembourg to redundantly connect all commercial data centers.

Data centers

LuxConnect currently operates three carrier neutral data centers across the country, providing more than 9.150 m2 of net IT surface dedicated to server rooms.
Two of these data centers are located in Bettembourg and one is in Bissen.

LuxConnect is currently building a fourth data center located in Bettembourg, Krakelshaff zoning.

The data centers of LuxConnect are certified by the Uptime Institute.
- Data Center DC1.1 Tier IV Design certified in July 2013.
- Data Center DC2 Tier IV and Tier II Design certified in March 2014.
- Data Center DC1.3 Tier IV, Tier III and Tier II Design certified in May 2014.

LuxConnect applies a green environment policy incorporating latest technologies to maximize energy efficiency and reduce water consumption. LuxConnect operates the first green datacenter in Luxembourg, where the cooling is achieved by means of an absorption refrigerator using waste heat from a cogeneration plant.

Philosophy 

LuxConnect behaves as a strong supporter for the ICT industry facilitating its activity deployment in Luxembourg.

It is also an active member of LU-CIX (LUxembourg Commercial Internet eXchange).

External links
 LuxConnect website
 LU-CIX website

References

Communications in Luxembourg